Typhoon Talim, known in the Philippines as Typhoon Isang, was a strong tropical cyclone that passed over Taiwan on the night of August 31 to September 1, 2005, and over Southeast China on September 2. At peak intensity, Talim was a Category 4 super typhoon. The name of the typhoon comes from the Tagalog term talim (pronounced [taˈlim]), which means "a sharp or cutting edge".

Meteorological history

Impact

Taiwan

Mainland China
More than 15 million people were affected by the storm. At least 110 people were reported dead in eastern China, mainly because of floods and landslides. A further 28 people were reported missing. More than 150,000 people were evacuated, and thousands of homes were damaged or destroyed. The Ministry of Civil Affairs in China reported that the typhoon caused 12.19 billion yuan (about US$1.5 billion) of economic losses.

Philippines

References 

 Typhoon Talim (Isang) (CNN)
 Typhoon kills 11 in China, three in Taiwan (Metronews)
 Typhoon death toll rises in China, BBC, 5 September 2005
 Typhoon Talim leaves 95 dead, 30 missing: ministry (Xinhua)

External links 

JMA General Information of Typhoon Talim (0513) from Digital Typhoon
JMA Best Track Data of Typhoon Talim (0513) 
JMA Best Track Data (Graphics) of Typhoon Talim (0513)
JMA Best Track Data (Text)
JTWC Best Track Data of Super Typhoon 13W (Talim)
13W.TALIM from the U.S. Naval Research Laboratory
 Gary Pagdett's Monthly Global Tropical Cyclone Summary

Talim
Talim
Talim
Typhoon Talim
Talim
Talim
2005 in Taiwan
Typhoons
Talim